The Adolphus W. Brower House, in Sycamore, Illinois, has been listed on the National Register of Historic Places since February 14, 1979. The home is located on Illinois Route 64 as it passes through the DeKalb County seat of Sycamore as DeKalb Avenue. The Italianate structure, constructed of stone and asphalt, was erected in 1876 by Sycamore merchant Adolphus W. Brower. It is also known as the George F. Beasley House.

Notes

External links

National Register nomination

National Register of Historic Places in DeKalb County, Illinois
Sycamore, Illinois
Houses on the National Register of Historic Places in Illinois
Houses in DeKalb County, Illinois